Coast Guard Air Station Savannah is a United States Coast Guard Air Station located at Hunter Army Airfield in Savannah, Georgia.

Operations and missions 
Coast Guard Air Station (CGAS) Savannah supports a multitude of Coast Guard missions worldwide. 
Air Station Savannah provides Search & Rescue (SAR) coverage 24 hours a day, 365 days a year, for 450 miles of shoreline from the northern border of South Carolina to Melbourne, Florida, averaging more than 250 SAR cases a year. Other missions include: Marine Safety, Marine Environmental Protection, Fisheries Enforcement, Aids to Navigation support, Migrant Interdiction, Drug Interdiction, Other Law Enforcement and Defense Readiness. Many of these missions require deployment of aviation detachments aboard Coast Guard Cutters.

History 
CGAS Savannah was commissioned in the summer of 1963 on what was then known as Hunter Air Force Base, which became Hunter Army Airfield in 1967. In 1964, the Coast Guard's original HH-52A Basic Operational Training Unit (BOTU) was established in Savannah. This unit was the forerunner of the Coast Guard's specialized aviator training program now located at the Coast Guard Aviation Training Center in Mobile, Alabama.

References

External links 
 CGAS Savannah official site

United States Coast Guard Air Stations
Military facilities in Savannah, Georgia
1963 establishments in Georgia (U.S. state)